RBY may refer to:

Aeronautics
Ruby Airport (IATA code RBY), a public-use airport in Ruby, Alaska
Vision Airlines (ICAO code RBY), a defunct American airline

Military
Royal Buckinghamshire Yeomanry, a British Army squadron
RBY MK 1, an Israeli light armored reconnaissance vehicle

Other uses
RYB color model
R. B. Y. Scott (1899–1987), a Canadian minister and Old Testament scholar
Pokémon Red, Blue, and Yellow; see Pokémon (video game series)#First generation (1996–1999)
 Rby., standard RHS abbreviation for the orchid nothogenus Rhynchobrassoleya (= Brassavola × Cattleya × Rhyncholaelia), see × Brassolaeliocattleya